Kenya national youth football team may refer to:
 Kenya national under-20 football team
 Kenya national under-17 football team

Kenya national football team